WWE Superstar Spectacle was a professional wrestling television special and livestreaming event produced by WWE. It featured wrestlers from the promotion's Raw, SmackDown, and NXT brand divisions. The event was taped on January 22, 2021, and aired on January 26 for India's Republic Day. The event was specially produced for WWE's Indian market as a part of their five-year deal with Sony Pictures Networks India. The event also incorporated elements of traditional and contemporary Indian culture and emanated from the WWE ThunderDome, hosted at Tropicana Field in St. Petersburg, Florida. 

Five matches were contested at the event. In the main event match, WWE Champion Drew McIntyre and The Indus Sher (Rinku and Saurav) defeated The Bollywood Boyz (Samir Singh and Sunil Singh) and the returning Jinder Mahal. The event also featured the participation of 10 Indian wrestlers from WWE's developmental system. The company later announced that 20 million people had watched the event live.

Production

Background 
Coming out of the American professional wrestling promotion WWE's third-quarter financial call on October 29, 2020, WWE's President and Chief Financial Officer, Nick Khan, announced that they were working with Sony Pictures Networks India on producing an event specially targeted to their Indian market, which would air in 2021 as a television special on India's Republic Day (January 26) and would mainly feature the promotion's developing Indian wrestlers.

As with all other WWE programming at the time due to the COVID-19 pandemic, Superstar Spectacle was filmed in Florida with no in-person spectators using WWE's "ThunderDome" bubble, by then located at Tropicana Field in St. Petersburg, Florida. Reports prior to the taping suggested the special would be filmed at the WWE Performance Center's "Capitol Wrestling Center" studio, the current home of NXT, but this was not the case.

On January 13, 2021, the title for the event was announced as Superstar Spectacle, and WWE announced that WWE Champion Drew McIntyre, Rey Mysterio, Charlotte Flair, AJ Styles, Bayley, The New Day (Kofi Kingston and Xavier Woods), Shinsuke Nakamura, Cesaro, Dolph Ziggler, Robert Roode, Natalya, Ricochet, WWE Hall of Famer Ric Flair, and many more would be in attendance at the event.  Jinder Mahal, the first WWE Champion of Indian descent, The Bollywood Boyz (Sunil Singh and Samir Singh), The Indus Sher (Rinku and Saurav), Jeet Rama, Kavita Devi, Giant Zanjeer, Dilsher Shanky, and Guru Raaj, were all further confirmed to appear. The event would premiere on Sony Max, Sony Ten 1, and Sony Ten 3, with commentary available in English and Hindi. Outside of India, the special was also released on WWE Network.

Storylines 
The event included matches that resulted from scripted storylines, where wrestlers portrayed heroes, villains, or less distinguishable characters in scripted events that built tension and culminated in a wrestling match. Results were predetermined by WWE's writers on the Raw, SmackDown, and NXT brands, while storylines were produced on WWE's weekly television shows, Monday Night Raw, Friday Night SmackDown, and NXT.

Reception 
Ian Hamilton of 411mania gave Superstar Spectacle a 7.2 out of 10, remarking of the Indian performers (including those making their television debut) that "for a group of guys effectively trained from scratch, this wasn’t half bad", and believing that the show was a potential step towards a future "NXT India" (following the example of NXT UK).

According to Sean Ross Sapp of Fightful, WWE claimed that 20 million people watched the event live.

Results

See also 

 Professional wrestling in India

Notes

References

External links 
 
 

2021 WWE Network events
2021 in professional wrestling in Florida
 Professional wrestling in India
Events in St. Petersburg, Florida
January 2021 events in the United States
Professional wrestling in St. Petersburg, Florida